Wanted: Dead or Alive is the second album by the hip hop duo Kool G Rap & DJ Polo. The album was released a year after the duo's debut, Road to the Riches, and received greater acclaim from most music critics. The singles "Streets of New York" and "Erase Racism" received notable airplay on Yo! MTV Raps and the former is credited by Nas as being influential on his song "N.Y. State of Mind" from his critically acclaimed album Illmatic.

Lyrically, the album shows a greater variety of themes, from the battle rap braggadocio that dominated Road to the Riches, to topics of crime, poverty, racism ("Erase Racism"), and raunchy sex rap ("Talk Like Sex").  Perhaps most significantly, there is greater emphasis on vivid descriptions of crime and urban squalor ("Streets of New York") and references to organized crime, gang violence, contract killing, and Mafia films (the title track, "Money in the Bank", "Death Wish"), which helped cement Kool G Rap's reputation as the founder of mafioso rap.

Background & recording

Kool G Rap & DJ Polo appeared on the New York hip hop scene in 1986, releasing "It's a Demo" (produced by Marley Marl) and becoming recognized members of the Juice Crew. More singles followed until G Rap's appearance on "The Symphony", a Juice Crew posse cut that also featured Big Daddy Kane. After this, the Queens bred duo went into the studio with Marley Marl to cut their first full length, Road to the Riches. Although the title track laid the foundation for much of New York's gangsta rap for the next decade, the album was mostly composed of battle rap based material, in line with other rappers like Rakim and Big Daddy Kane.

For their next album's production the duo jettisoned Marley Marl, in a move similar to other Juice Crew members. Marley's lone contribution, "Rikers Island", was a single from 1987, and it seems to have been tacked on to the album at the last minute, as G Rap had no idea it was on there until years later when interviewed about it. Instead Eric B. was brought in to "handle" production. Known more as a money man than a real DJ or producer, Eric Barrier was responsible for putting on Rakim and getting him his record deal. Barrier had enlisted a young Large Professor to ghost produce parts of Let the Rhythm Hit 'Em after the record's original producer, Paul C, was murdered. Noting his talents, Barrier gave Large Professor a similar task for G Rap's second album, to produce the beats and let Barrier take the credit. Large Professor would later address this on Main Source's "Snake Eyes", off the legendary Breaking Atoms. Large Professor's involvement was much larger than on Let the Rhythm Hit 'Em, and the only tracks not noted as being produced by him are the aforementioned "Rikers Island", "Erase Racism" (which was produced by Biz Markie & Cool V) and "The Polo Club".

Track listing
(*) denotes co-producer

Charts

Rikers Island (single)

"Rikers Island" is the second single from American hip hop duo Kool G Rap & DJ Polo, originally released as a non-album single with "Rhyme Time" as a B-side in 1987 and later re-released as the fourth single from the 1990 album Wanted: Dead or Alive. It was later also featured on the compilation albums Killer Kuts (1994) and The Best of Cold Chillin' (2000).

Background
Produced by Marley Marl, "Rikers Island" is a hardcore hip hop song that warns of the dangers of living a life of crime and ending up in the Rikers Island jail where violence is a daily occurrence and even the toughest street criminals can be broken down.

Samples
"Rikers Island" was later sampled on
"40 Island" by Noreaga featuring Kool G Rap and Mussolini

Track listing
A-side
 "Rikers Island" (5:37)

B-side
 "Rhyme Time" (6:29)

Videos (added to 2007 Traffic Entertainment reissue)
Streets of New York
Erase Racism

References

External links
 "Rikers Island" at Discogs

1990 albums
Albums produced by Eric B.
Albums produced by Large Professor
Albums produced by Marley Marl
Cold Chillin' Records albums
Kool G Rap albums